Corner Shot may refer to:

 Corner Shot Holdings, LLC company, which makes the following product:
 CornerShot weapon accessory